Eriogonum trichopes is a species of wild buckwheat known by the common name little desert trumpet. It is native to the mountain slopes and deserts of the southwestern United States from California to New Mexico, and its range extends into Mexico.

Description
This is an annual herb quite variable in height, growing to a spindly 10 centimeters or a sprawling, brambly 1.5 meters. Its leaves form a basal patch on the ground, each rounded with ruffled margins and covered in woolly or stiff hairs.

The erect inflorescence is naked and sometimes hairy, with many slender branches that flower year-round. Flower clusters hang on short, thready stalks. Each minuscule flower is glandular or hairy and is bright yellow when new, darkening over time to a reddish color.

External links
Jepson Manual Treatment
Photo gallery

trichopes
Flora of the Southwestern United States
Flora of California
Flora of New Mexico
Flora of the Sonoran Deserts
Flora of the California desert regions
Natural history of the California chaparral and woodlands
Natural history of the Colorado Desert
Natural history of the Mojave Desert
Natural history of the Peninsular Ranges
Flora without expected TNC conservation status